Tyoply Stan may refer to:
Tyoply Stan District, a district of Moscow, Russia
Tyoply Stan (Moscow Metro), a station of the Moscow Metro, Russia
Tyoply Stan Street